Unguan is a small island off the coast of Rakhine State, Myanmar.

Geography

Nearby islands
Nantha Kyun, located about  SSE of Unguan.

See also
List of islands of Burma

References 

Islands of Myanmar
Rakhine State